Brenda Dickinson  is a British archaeologist. She is a leading scholar in the study of Roman pottery, and a specialist in Roman potter's stamps.

Career 
Dickinson collaborated with Brian Hartley at the University of Leeds. Together they catalogued samian stamps over a 40-year period from central and western Europe. The catalogue was published in a nine-part volume in 2008 entitled 'Names on Terra Sigillata. An Index of Makers' Stamps & Signatures on Gallo-Roman Terra Sigillata (Samian Ware)', containing around 300,000 stamps from 5,000 potters. Dickinson is credited with turning "Brian Hartley's vision of an index of dies linked to historical data into a reality in book form." The volumes are accompanied by a database hosted by the RGZM. Throughout her career Dickinson authored numerous site reports on samian stamps.

Dickinson was a Honorary Visiting Fellow in Classics 2006–12 at the University of Leeds.

Awards and honours 
She was elected as a Fellow of the Society of Antiquaries in 1994. A Festschrift was published in honour of Dickinson in 2012.

Dickinson and colleagues received the 2013 John Gillam Prize from the Study Group for Roman Pottery.

Selected publications 
 (9 vols)

References 

Living people
British archaeologists
Women classical scholars
Academics of the University of Leeds
Fellows of the Society of Antiquaries of London
Year of birth missing (living people)
British women archaeologists